Silver Peak is an 11,878-foot-elevation (3,620 meter) mountain summit located in the Sierra Nevada mountain range in Fresno County, California, United States. It is set in the John Muir Wilderness, on land managed by Sierra National Forest. The peak is situated on Silver Divide, two miles northwest of Graveyard Peak. The first ascent of the summit was made prior to 1937 by an unknown party. Inclusion on the Sierra Peaks Section peakbagging list generates climbing interest.

Climate

According to the Köppen climate classification system, Silver Peak is located in an alpine climate zone. Most weather fronts originate in the Pacific Ocean, and travel east toward the Sierra Nevada mountains. As fronts approach, they are forced upward by the peaks (orographic lift), causing them to drop their moisture in the form of rain or snowfall onto the range. Precipitation runoff from the mountain drains into tributaries of the San Joaquin River.

Etymology
Headwaters of Silver Creek originate from several lakes along the west slope of Silver Peak. Theodore Solomons so named the creek because of its silvery appearance, and the peak he named in association with the creek. This landform's toponym has been officially adopted by the U.S. Board on Geographic Names. There are 10 mountains in California with this same official name, and this one has the highest elevation.

See also
 
 Mount Izaak Walton

References

Sierra National Forest
Mountains of Fresno County, California
Mountains of the John Muir Wilderness
North American 3000 m summits
Mountains of Northern California
Sierra Nevada (United States)